The MCST R2000 is a 64-bit microprocessor developed by Moscow Center of SPARC Technologies (MCST) and fabricated by TSMC.

MCST R2000 Highlights
implements the SPARC V9 instruction set architecture (ISA)
octa-core
core specifications:
out-of-order, dual-issue superscalar
two integer units
one floating-point unit
integrated memory controller
integrated ccNUMA controller
2 GHz clock rate
28 nm process
~500 million transistors

References

SPARC microprocessors
64-bit microprocessors